Houston Publishing Demos 2002 is a demo album by alternative rock artist Mark Lanegan. It was released on August 21, 2015 on Ipecac Recordings, although it was recorded thirteen years earlier.  Musicians who played on the album include Lanegan collaborator Mike Johnson, guitarist Ian Moore, and Willie Nelson's longtime harmonica player Mickey Raphael.

Recording
In his book I Am the Wolf: Lyrics & Writings, Lanegan writes he traveled to Houston in 2002 "to fulfill a publishing contract I had signed with an old friend, producer and label head Randall Jamail, a talented man who took no shit from anyone and who would not have been pleased if he knew the honest state of my unprepared and unraveling songcraft, such as it was."  Lanegan wrote many of the songs in the parking lot on the spot as the band overdubbed in the studio.  As he recalls in I Am the Wolf:

Mark Deming of AllMusic: "The arrangements are full-bodied but leave plenty of open space, which suits the dusty overtones of Lanegan's melodies, and this music is a fine match for the phantoms and lost souls who populate Lanegan's songs (ten of which get their first public hearing on this release).  Houston: Publishing Demos 2002 is by no means a lost masterpiece, but in many ways this is more satisfying and a better platform for Lanegan's talents than Bubblegum, which was his next solo effort, released in 2004.

Track listing

Personnel
 Mark Lanegan – vocals
 Mike Johnson - acoustic and electric guitar
 Ian Moore – guitar, sitar
 Bukka Allen – keyboards, accordion
 Steve Bailey – bass
 Keni Richards – drums
 Mickey Raphael – harmonicas
 Jon Langford – cover art

References

Mark Lanegan albums
Ipecac Recordings albums
2015 albums
Albums produced by Alain Johannes
Demo albums